Aguinaldo Velloso Borges Ribeiro (born 13 February 1969) is a Brazilian who has served as minister of cities under the Rousseff administration and a member of the champer of deputies from Paraíba.

Personal life
Ribeiro comes from a political family, with his father Enivaldo being the leader of the PP in the state and mayor of Campina Grande from 1977 to 1983; his mother Virgínia was mayor of Pilar, and his sister Daniella is a senator in the local jurisdiction. Ribeiro is a devout Baptist and often takes part with evangelical politicians in campaigning for positions based on Christian values.

Ribeiro was at one time a close ally of Eduardo Cunha, and was one of the few deputies in the senate who did not vote for an investigation into Cunha for corruption. Eventually however Ribeiro relented to pressure from other politicians and voted in favor of the investigation, which lead to Cunha denouncing him as a "traitor, liar, and hypocrite."

Political career
Although initially backing her, Ribeiro would ultimately vote in favor of the impeachment against then-president Dilma Rousseff. He would later back Rousseff's successor Michel Temer against a similar impeachment motion, and also voted in favor of the Brazil labor reform (2017).

Controversies
Ribeiro has been criticized for promoting his family members to political positions, such as appointing one of his nieces as a manager of a firm where she received 700 hours of paid labor for a job she only had to sporadically come to.

Ribeiro was investigated in Operation Car Wash due to being named by Alberto Youssef. Shortly afterwards Ribeiro and several other politicians were publicly named by Rodrigo Janot in February 2017 as being investigated for taking bribes. In April 2017 it was announced that Ribeiro and 6 politicians were no longer being investigated, with Ribeiro claiming that this was proof of his innocence.

References

|-

|-

|-

1969 births
Living people
People from Campina Grande
Progressistas politicians
Government ministers of Brazil
Brazilian Baptists
Members of the Chamber of Deputies (Brazil) from Paraíba
Members of the Legislative Assembly of Paraíba